New Norcia Station (also known as NNO) is an ESTRACK  Earth station in Australia for communication with spacecraft after launch, in low earth orbit, in geostationary orbit and in deep space. It was the first ESA deep space ground station, followed by Cebreros Station and Malargüe Station.

The station operates a 35-meter dish designated NNO-1 capable of two-way transmission in both S- and X-bands using 2 and 20-kilowatt transmitters. The antenna weighs over 600 tonnes and is 40 metres tall. Future upgrade plans include adding a Ka-band station to support international missions.

Construction began in April 2000 and lasted until the end of the first half of 2002. Installation of electronics and communication equipment followed. The station was officially opened on 5 March 2003 by the Premier of Western Australia at the time, Dr Geoff Gallop.

A new 4.5-metre dish designated NNO-2 was inaugurated on 11 February 2016. NNO-2 acts as an acquisition aid for the 35-metre dish for fast-moving satellites and launch vehicles during their launch and early orbit stage.

The NNO-2 mount is capable of tracking at 20 degrees per second in azimuth and 10 degrees per second in elevation.

The 4.5-metre dish has a half-power beam width of 1.9 degrees at S-band and 0.5 degrees at X-band and can be used to communicate with spacecraft up to 100,000 kilometres in altitude. To help in signal acquisition when the spacecraft position is too uncertain, the 4.5-metre dish has a 0.75-metre dish piggy-backed onto it, with a half-power beam width of 3.5 degrees at X-band. There is no S-band capability on the 0.75m dish.

NNO-2 may also be operated independently of NNO-1, as it commonly does during support activities for launches of Ariane 5, Vega, and Soyuz rockets from the Guiana Space Centre.

New Norcia Station was one of the stations providing communications, tracking and data download from the Rosetta spacecraft. It supports the BepiColombo mission.

In December 2019, ESA announced plans to build a second 35m deep space antenna at New Norcia to provide coverage for upcoming ESA missions, including Solar Orbiter, Hera, and Jupiter Icy Moons Explorer. This is expected to start operations in mid-2024.

Since June 2019,  operational support and maintenance of the station has been the responsibility of CSIRO.

References

External links

 Talking to Satellites in Deep Space from New Norcia, chapter from ESA Bulletin, May 2003.
 Europe’s Access to Deep Space: The Deep Space Ground Station in Australia

European Space Agency
ESTRACK facilities
Infrastructure completed in 2003
Earth stations in Western Australia
2003 establishments in Australia
New Norcia, Western Australia